KNDR (104.7 FM) is a Christian radio station founded in 1977 in Mandan, North Dakota. Before KLBE-LP signed on, it was the only local source in Bismarck-Mandan for contemporary Christian music, along with Bible-based talk and teaching programming.

Though it is licensed as a commercial radio station by the Federal Communications Commission, KNDR acts as a nonprofit organization using commercial advertisements as a way to fund, though it also takes donations.

External links
KNDR website

NDR
Contemporary Christian radio stations in the United States
Moody Radio affiliate stations
Radio stations established in 1997
NDR